Matt Bondurant, aka Dr. Literary Fiction,  born in 1971, is an American novelist.  Among his works are the books The Third Translation, The Wettest County in the World and The Night Swimmer.

Life and career

Bondurant was born and raised in Alexandria, Virginia, near Washington, D.C. His family's ancestral home was in Franklin County, Virginia.  He graduated with a B.A. and M.A. in English from James Madison University, where he was a member of Pi Kappa Phi fraternity. Matt went on to earn a PhD in English at Florida State University in 2003.  

Matt Bondurant’s latest novel Oleander City, was released in June of 2022.  Oleander is his second novel based on a true story, concerning events surrounding the 1900 Galveston Hurricane, including the tragedy of the St. Mary's Orphanage and a boxing match between a young Jack Johnson, a Galveston native, and "Chrysanthemum Joe" Choynski, who many consider the greatest Jewish boxer of all time.  His third book The Night Swimmer was published by Scribner in 2012, and was featured in the New York Times Book Review, Outside Magazine, and The Daily Beast, among others.  His second novel The Wettest County in the World (Scribner 2008) is an international bestseller, a New York Times Editor’s Pick, a San Francisco Chronicle Best 50 Books of the Year, and was made into a feature film (Lawless) by director John Hillcoat, starring Shia Labeouf, Tom Hardy, Jessica Chastain, Mia Wasikowska, Gary Oldman, and Guy Pearce.  His first novel The Third Translation (Hyperion 2005) is also an international bestseller, translated into 14 languages worldwide.  He has published short stories in such journals as Glimmer Train, The New England Review, and Prairie Schooner, and others.   

Bondurant is the Creative Director of the Longleaf Writers Conference, held each May in the town of Seaside, Florida.  Matt founded the conference in 2013 with the poet and fiction writer Seth Brady Tucker and Florida educator Jonathan D'Avingnon.  In 2018 they founded Longleaf Educational Services, a 501-3c non-profit organization which provides creative educational experiences for underserved schools in the Florida panhandle.  
  
Bondurant has written feature articles, essays, and reviews for Outside Magazine, Newsweek, and the Huffington Post, among other magazines and newspapers.  Specializing in adventure and endurance events, he’s published articles in Texas Monthly magazine about competing in the Texas Water Safari - "The World's Toughest Canoe Race” and in participating in Ned Denison’s English Channel Swim Training Camp in Ireland, the “most brutal, the most unforgiving, the most downright dastardly difficult open water swimming camp in the world” for Outside Magazine.  He has published poems in The Notre Dame Review and Ninth Letter, among others, and his poetry is featured in Imaginative Writing, the most widely adopted creative writing text in the world. His most recent non-fiction piece, “The Real Thing” was selected for the 2017 Best Food Writing anthology. 

Bondurant has sold three original screenplays and in 2013 he secured a development deal with HBO/Cinemax to write and executive produce an original one-hour dramatic series.  He is currently developing a drama series for Warner Brothers Television based on his latest novel-in-progress. 

A former John Gardner Fellow in Fiction at Bread Loaf, Kingsbury Fellow at Florida State, and Walter E. Dakin Fellow at Sewanee, Matt has held residencies at Yaddo and the MacDowell Colony.  He has appeared on various media outlets in support of his work including NPR, Radio France, The Discovery Channel, and MSNBC.  In the past Matt worked for the Associated Press National Broadcast Office in Washington DC, as an on-air announcer and producer at a local NPR station in Virginia, and as a Steward at the British Museum in London, England.   

He previously taught literature and creative writing at George Mason University in Virginia, SUNY Plattsburgh, and University of Texas at Dallas.  Bondurant currently teaches at the University of Mississippi in Oxford, MS.

Works

Novels 

 The Third Translation (2005)
 The Wettest County in the World (2008)
 The Night Swimmer (2012)
 Oleander City (2022)

Adaptations 

In 2009, director John Hillcoat was developing a film of the same name based on Bondurant's novel, with a script by Nick Cave, and starring Shia LaBeouf, Tom Hardy and Jessica Chastain. The project was shut down in January 2010 due to financing problems.

An independent studio called Annapurna Pictures (based in Los Angeles) revived the project later that year and began filming in late February 2011. Starring Shia LaBeouf, Tom Hardy, Guy Pearce, Gary Oldman, Mia Wasikowska, and Jessica Chastain. In March 2012, the title was changed to Lawless. The film was released in the U.S. in late August 2012.

Reception 

Bondurant was inspired by family stories to make Franklin County the setting of his Prohibition-era historical novel, The Wettest County in the World (2008). His grandfather, Jack Bondurant, and two granduncles ran a massive moonshining operation in the mountains of southwest Virginia. Reviewing the novel for Entertainment Weekly, Jennifer Reese said it was "somber, engrossing", and that Bondurant was "wonderful at evoking historical atmosphere," including "drunken gatherings that explode into shattering violence." She thought the pace slow in parts.

References

External links 
 

American historical novelists
21st-century American novelists
American male novelists
Living people
Writers from Alexandria, Virginia
James Madison University alumni
University of Texas at Dallas faculty
1971 births
21st-century American male writers
Novelists from Texas
Novelists from Virginia